Charles L. Epstein is a Thomas A. Scott Professor of Mathematics at the University of Pennsylvania, Philadelphia.

Research interests
Epstein is an analyst and applied mathematician.  His interests include microlocal analysis and index theory; boundary value problems; nuclear magnetic resonance and medical imaging; and mathematical biology.

Education and work
Epstein was an undergraduate in mathematics at the Massachusetts Institute of Technology and graduate student at the Courant Institute, New York University, where he received his Ph.D. in 1983 under the direction of Peter Lax.

He did a postdoc with William Thurston before moving to the University of Pennsylvania, where he has been since. Epstein won a Sloan Research Fellowship in 1988.

He is currently Thomas A. Scott Professor of Mathematics and serves as graduate chair of Applied Mathematics and Computational Science from 2008 to June 2019.

Awards and honors

In 2014, he became a Fellow of the American Mathematical Society "for contributions to analysis, geometry, and applied mathematics including medical imaging, as well as for service to the profession".

Books
C L Epstein, Introduction to the mathematics of medical imaging.  Second edition. Society for Industrial and Applied Mathematics (SIAM), Philadelphia, PA, 2008. xxxiv+761 pp. 
C L Epstein, The spectral theory of geometrically periodic hyperbolic 3-manifolds. Mem. Amer. Math. Soc. 58 (1985), no. 335, ix+161 pp.

Publications
C L Epstein, R B Melrose, G A Mendoza, Resolvent of the Laplacian on strictly pseudoconvex domains. Acta Mathematica 167 (1991), no. 1–2, 1–106.
C L Epstein, The hyperbolic Gauss map and quasiconformal reflections. Journal für die Reine und Angewandte Mathematik 372 (1986), 96–135.
C L Epstein, R Melrose, Contact degree and the index of Fourier integral operators. Math. Res. Lett. 5 (1998), no. 3, 363–381.
C L Epstein, Embeddable CR-structures and deformations of pseudoconvex surfaces. I. Formal deformations. J. Algebraic Geom. 5 (1996), no. 2, 277–368.
C L Epstein, CR-structures on three-dimensional circle bundles. Invent. Math. 109 (1992), no. 2, 351–403.
D M Burns, C L Epstein, Embeddability for three-dimensional CR-manifolds. J. Amer. Math. Soc. 3 (1990), no. 4, 809–841.
C L Epstein A relative index on the space of embeddable CR-structures. I. Annals of Mathematics (2) 147 (1998), no. 1, 1–59.
C L Epstein, Asymptotics for closed geodesics in a homology class, the finite volume case. Duke Math. J. 55 (1987), no. 4, 717–757.
C L Epstein; G M Henkin, Stability of embeddings for pseudoconcave surfaces and their boundaries. Acta Mathematica 185 (2000), no. 2, 161–237.
C L Epstein, A relative index on the space of embeddable CR-structures. II. Annals of Mathematics (2) 147 (1998), no. 1, 61–91.
D Burns, C L Epstein, Characteristic numbers of bounded domains. Acta Mathematica 164 (1990), no. 1–2, 29–71.
C L Epstein, M Gage, The curve shortening flow. Wave motion: theory, modelling, and computation (Berkeley, Calif., 1986), 15–59, Math. Sci. Res. Inst. Publ., 7, Springer, New York, 1987.
D M Burns,  Jr, C L Epstein, A global invariant for three-dimensional CR-manifolds. Invent. Math. 92 (1988), no. 2, 333–348.
C L Epstein, G M Henkin, Extension of CR-structures for 3-dimensional pseudoconcave manifolds. Multidimensional complex analysis and partial differential equations (São Carlos, 1995), 51–67, Contemp. Math., 205, Amer. Math. Soc., Providence, RI, 1997.
C L Epstein, B Kleiner, Spherical means in annular regions. Comm. Pure Appl. Math. 46 (1993), no. 3, 441–451.
C L Epstein, G M Henkin, Embeddings for 3-dimensional CR-manifolds. Complex analysis and geometry (Paris, 1997), 223–236, Progr. Math., 188, Birkhäuser, Basel, 2000.
C L Epstein, Subelliptic SpinC Dirac operators. I. Annals of Mathematics (2) 166 (2007), no. 1, 183–214.

References

External links

Charles L. Epstein webpage

21st-century American mathematicians
20th-century American mathematicians
Living people
University of Pennsylvania faculty
Mathematicians at the University of Pennsylvania
Fellows of the American Mathematical Society
Courant Institute of Mathematical Sciences alumni
Massachusetts Institute of Technology School of Science alumni
Sloan Research Fellows
Mathematicians from Pennsylvania
Year of birth missing (living people)